Methanothermobacter marburgensis is a thermophilic and obligately autotrophic archaeon. Its type strain is MarburgT. Its genome has been sequenced.

It is named after the city of Marburg in Germany, where it was isolated from sewage sludge, but it also lives in hot springs.  The cells are slender and bar-shaped.  They reduce carbon dioxide and hydrogen for energy, but they can also metabolize ethyl.

References

Further reading

External links
LPSN

Type strain of Methanothermobacter marburgensis at BacDive -  the Bacterial Diversity Metadatabase

Euryarchaeota